Gertrud Leupi (1 March 1825 – 26 March 1904) was a Swiss Benedictine nun and founder of monasteries. She founded the Maria Rickenbach Monastery, Switzerland, the Yankton Benedictine, South Dakota, and the Marienburg monastery, Wikon, Switzerland.

Biography
Gertrude Leupi was born in a farming family on 1 March 1825 in Wikon, Switzerland. In 1846 her family moved to Lucerne. In 1848 she entered the Baldegg Monastery and professed her Benedictine vows. After completing her teacher's training, she taught in the Cistercian monastery in Frauenthal and the  Benedictine monastery in Engelberg.

In 1857, along with Vincentia Gretener, she founded the Maria Rickenbach monastery in Niederrickenbach, where the  perpetual adoration was developed. She became the superior of the Maria Rickenbach monastery in 1858 and stayed for 25 years. 

In 1873, a request to send nuns to perform various tasks including teaching in the founding of Benedictines affiliates in the United States was made to the Maria Rickenbach monastery.  In responding to this call for service, Leupi showed interest to travel across the Atlantic. She arrived in Maryville, Missouri from Switzerland on 1 November 1880 and served for more than 10 years.

Between 1883 and 1887, along with other sisters, Leupi established a mother house in Zell, South Dakota to support their missionary activities. In 1887, Martin Marty, Catholic bishop, encouraged Leupi and other nuns to work in Yankton, South Dakota where the Sacred Heart Monastery was established. She made important contributions in educating girls from the Sioux tribe.

On her return to Wikon, Switzerland in 1891, she bought a castle with the help of her nephew pastor Josef Leupi, where she founded the Marienburg monastery. She continued the educational and missionary activities. 

She died in Wikon, Switzerland, on 26 March 1904.

References

1825 births
1904 deaths
 
Benedictine nuns
19th-century Roman Catholic nuns
20th-century Roman Catholic nuns
Swiss Roman Catholic religious sisters and nuns
People from the canton of Lucerne